is a passenger railway station located in Minami-ku, Sakai, Osaka Prefecture, Japan, operated by the Semboku Rapid Railway. It is station number SB04.

Lines

Station layout
The station consists of one elevated island platform with the station building underneath.

Platforms

Adjacent stations

History
Toga-Mikita Station opened on December 7, 1973.

Passenger statistics
In fiscal 2019, the station was used by an average of 19,582 passengers daily (boarding passengers only).

Surrounding area
 Sakai City Minami Ward Office
 Nishihara Park
 Osaka Prefectural Sakai Nishi High School
 Osaka Prefectural Fukuizumi High School

See also
List of railway stations in Japan

References

External links

Semboku Rapid Railway official page

Railway stations in Japan opened in 1973
Railway stations in Osaka Prefecture
Sakai, Osaka